Aglossodes prionophoralis is a species of snout moth in the genus Aglossodes. It was described by Ragonot, in 1891, and is known from South Africa and Zimbabwe.

References

Moths described in 1891
Pyralinae
Lepidoptera of Zimbabwe
Moths of Sub-Saharan Africa
Lepidoptera of South Africa